Lasnigo (Valassinese  ) is a comune (municipality) in the Province of Como in the Italian region Lombardy, located about  north of Milan and about  northeast of Como. As of 31 December 2004, it had a population of 401 and an area of 5.6 km².

Lasnigo borders the following municipalities: Asso, Barni, Oliveto Lario, Sormano, Valbrona.

Demographic evolution

References

Cities and towns in Lombardy